Salah Qoqaiche (born 10 July 1967) is a retired Moroccan long-distance runner who specialized in the marathon race.

He won the gold medal at the 1991 Mediterranean Games and finished fifth in the marathon at the 1992 Summer Olympics. He also entered the 1997 World Championships, but did not finish.

Achievements

References

1967 births
Living people
Moroccan male marathon runners
Athletes (track and field) at the 1992 Summer Olympics
Olympic athletes of Morocco
Mediterranean Games gold medalists for Morocco
Mediterranean Games medalists in athletics
Athletes (track and field) at the 1991 Mediterranean Games